Within industry, piping is a system of pipes used to convey fluids (liquids and gases) from one location to another. The engineering discipline of piping design studies the efficient transport of fluid.

Industrial process piping (and accompanying in-line components) can be manufactured from wood, fiberglass, glass, steel, aluminum, plastic, copper, and concrete. The in-line components, known as fittings, valves, and other devices, typically sense and control the pressure, flow rate and temperature of the transmitted fluid, and usually are included in the field of piping design (or piping engineering), though the sensors and automatic controlling devices may alternatively be treated as part of instrumentation and control design. Piping systems are documented in piping and instrumentation diagrams (P&IDs).  If necessary, pipes can be cleaned by the tube cleaning process.

Piping sometimes refers to piping design, the detailed specification of the physical piping layout within a process plant or commercial building. In earlier days, this was sometimes called drafting, technical drawing, engineering drawing, and design, but is today commonly performed by designers that have learned to use automated computer-aided drawing or computer-aided design (CAD) software.

Plumbing is a piping system with which most people are familiar, as it constitutes the form of fluid transportation that is used to provide potable water and fuels to their homes and businesses. Plumbing pipes also remove waste in the form of sewage, and allow venting of sewage gases to the outdoors. Fire sprinkler systems also use piping, and may transport nonpotable or potable water, or other fire-suppression fluids.

Piping also has many other industrial applications, which are crucial for moving raw and semi-processed fluids for refining into more useful products. Some of the more exotic materials used in pipe construction are Inconel, titanium, chrome-moly and various other steel alloys.

Engineering sub-fields
Generally, industrial piping engineering has three major sub-fields:
Piping material
Piping design
Stress analysis

Stress analysis
Process piping and power piping are typically checked by pipe stress engineers to verify that the routing, nozzle loads, hangers, and supports are properly placed and selected such that allowable pipe stress is not exceeded under different loads such as sustained loads, operating loads, pressure testing loads, etc., as stipulated by the ASME B31, EN 13480, GOST 32388, RD 10-249 or any other applicable codes and standards. It is necessary to evaluate the mechanical behavior of the piping under regular loads (internal pressure and thermal stresses) as well under occasional and intermittent loading cases such as earthquake, high wind or special vibration, and water hammer. This evaluation is usually performed with the assistance of a specialized (finite element) pipe stress analysis computer programs such as AutoPIPE, CAEPIPE, CAESAR, PASS/START-PROF, ROHR2.

In cryogenic pipe supports, most steel become more brittle as the temperature decreases from normal operating conditions, so it is necessary to know the temperature distribution for cryogenic conditions. Steel structures will have areas of high stress that may be caused by sharp corners in the design, or inclusions in the material.

Materials
The material with which a pipe is manufactured often forms as the basis for choosing any pipe. Materials that are used for manufacturing pipes include:

Carbon steel
ASTM A252 Spec Grade 1, Grade 2, Grade 3 Steel Pile Pipe
Plastic piping, e.g. HDPE pipe, PP-R pipe or LDPE pipe.
Low temperature service carbon steel
Stainless steel
Nonferrous metals, e.g. cupro-nickel, tantalum lined, etc.
Nonmetallic, e.g. tempered glass, Teflon lined, PVC, etc.

History

Early wooden pipes were constructed out of logs that had a large hole bored lengthwise through the center. Later wooden pipes were constructed with staves and hoops similar to wooden barrel construction. Stave pipes have the advantage that they are easily transported as a compact pile of parts on a wagon and then assembled as a hollow structure at the job site. Wooden pipes were especially popular in mountain regions where transport of heavy iron or concrete pipes would have been difficult.

Wooden pipes were easier to maintain than metal, because the wood did not expand or contract with temperature changes as much as metal and so consequently expansion joints and bends were not required. The thickness of wood afforded some insulating properties to the pipes which helped prevent freezing as compared to metal pipes. Wood used for water pipes also does not rot very easily. Electrolysis does not affect wood pipes at all, since wood is a much better electrical insulator.

In the Western United States where redwood was used for pipe construction, it was found that redwood had "peculiar properties" that protected it from weathering, acids, insects, and fungus growths. Redwood pipes stayed smooth and clean indefinitely while iron pipe by comparison would rapidly begin to scale and corrode and could eventually plug itself up with the corrosion.

Standards 

There are certain standard codes that need to be followed while designing or manufacturing any piping system. Organizations that promulgate piping standards include:

ASME – The American Society of Mechanical Engineers – B31 series
 ASME B31.1 Power piping (steam piping etc.)
 ASME B31.3 Process piping
 ASME B31.4 Pipeline Transportation Systems for Liquid Hydrocarbons and Other Liquids and oil and gas
 ASME B31.5 Refrigeration piping and heat transfer components
 ASME B31.8 Gas transmission and distribution piping systems
 ASME B31.9 Building services piping
 ASME B31.11 Slurry Transportation Piping Systems (Withdrawn, Superseded by B31.4)
 ASME B31.12 Hydrogen Piping and Pipelines
ASTM – American Society for Testing and Materials
 ASTM A252 Standard Specification for Welded and Seamless Steel Pipe Piles
API – American Petroleum Institute
 API 5L Petroleum and natural gas industries—Steel pipe for pipeline transportation systems
 CWB – Canadian Welding Bureau
 EN 13480 – European metallic industrial piping code
 EN 13480-1 Metallic industrial piping – Part 1: General
 EN 13480-2 Metallic industrial piping – Part 2: Materials
 EN 13480-3 Metallic industrial piping – Part 3: Design and calculation
 EN 13480-4 Metallic industrial piping – Part 4: Fabrication and installation
 EN 13480-5 Metallic industrial piping – Part 5: Inspection and testing
 EN 13480-6 Metallic industrial piping – Part 6: Additional requirements for buried piping
 PD TR 13480-7 Metallic industrial piping – Part 7: Guidance on the use of conformity assessment procedures
 EN 13480-8 Metallic industrial piping – Part 8: Additional requirements for aluminium and aluminium alloy piping
 EN 13941 District heating pipes
 GOST, RD, SNiP, SP – Russian piping codes
RD 10-249 Power Piping
GOST 32388 Process Piping, HDPE Piping
SNiP 2.05.06-85 & SP 36.13330.2012 Gas and Oil transmission piping systems
GOST R 55990-2014 & SP 284.1325800.2016 Field pipelines
SP 33.13330.2012 Steel Pipelines
GOST R 55596-2013 District heating networks
EN 1993-4-3 Eurocode 3 – Design of steel structures – Part 4-3: Pipelines
AWS – American Welding Society
AWWA – American Water Works Association
MSS – Manufacturers' Standardization Society
ANSI – American National Standards Institute
NFPA – National Fire Protection Association
EJMA – Expansion Joint Manufacturers Association
Intro to pipe stress  - https://web.archive.org/web/20161008161619/http://oakridgebellows.com/metal-expansion-joints/metal-expansion-joints-in-one-minute/part-1-thermal-growth%26#x20;(one minute)

See also

Drainage
Firestop
Gasket
HDPE pipe
Hydraulic machinery
Hydrogen piping
Hydrostatic test
MS Pipe, MS Tube
Pipe Cutting
 Pipefitter
Pipe network analysis
Pipe marking
 Pipe support
Piping and plumbing fitting
Coupling (piping)
Double-walled pipe
Elbow (piping)
Nipple (plumbing)
Pipe cap
Street elbow
Union (plumbing)
Valve
Victaulic
Pipeline pre-commissioning
Plastic pipework
Plastic Pressure Pipe Systems
Plumbing
Riser clamp
Thermal insulation

References

Further reading
ASME B31.3 Process Piping Guide, Revision 2 from Los Alamos National Laboratory Engineering Standards Manual OST220-03-01-ESM
Seismic Design and Retrofit of Piping Systems, July 2002 from American Lifelines Alliance website
 Engineering and Design, Liquid Process Piping. Engineer manual, entire document  • (index page) • U.S. Army Corps of Engineers, EM 1110-l-4008, May 1999
 Integral Principals of The Structural Dynamics of Flow By L G Claret

External links

 
 oil and gas training courses online

 
Plumbing
Mechanical engineering
Building engineering
Chemical engineering